Miss Teen Nepal is the second-largest beauty pageant in Nepal. This pageant is held by the Kathmandu Jaycees where; teen-aged girls from Nepal participate in the pageant. The reigning Miss Teen Nepal is Miss Pratikchhya Dangol https://www.facebook.com/JCIKTM/photos/a.446310878879601/2210517562458915/}}, who was crowned as Miss Teen Nepal in 2022.

The first runner-up of Miss Teen Nepal 2022 is Miss Susmita Adhikari  and the second runner-up of Miss Teen Nepal 2022 is Miss Susjita Paudel.

History
Kathmandu Jaycees first started the Miss Teen Nepal in 2002 and has been annually held since then. “JCI Miss Teen Nepal” is the beauty pageants held annually by Kathmandu Jaycees. Miss Teen Nepal is the second-largest beauty pageant in Nepal. Kathmandu Jaycees first started the Miss Teen Nepal in 2002 and has been successfully conducted 18th edition. It is mostly focus to all the talented, intelligent and confident young girls who are willing to participate. Total 24-25 participants are selected for the finalist. After the “Miss Teen Nepal” finalists are selected they are groomed for 22–24 days before the Grand Finale. These training periods are the golden opportunity for the contestant to develop their personality, learn effective public speaking, get chance to meet great personality from different area. Past Miss Nepal and Miss Teen also share their experience to the participants and also different outgoing activities are also conducted for the refreshment, entertainment and learning for the participants.
The pageant is live telecast through Image Television.

For the Miss Teen Nepal. The application must be at least 16 to 18 years old originally, which was extended to 19 in 2006.

In 2007, Khusbu Oli had an argument with her successor Ayusha Karki; as Ayusha had joined another pageant of World Miss University 2007 in less than a month gap in which she ended up winning the crown, ended Khusbu was the 1st runner up which cause this controversial argument.

Miss Teen Nepal Winners

Remarks
 Ayusha Karki, Miss Teen Nepal 2007; had later won the title of World Miss University Nepal 2007 and also competed in Miss Nepal 2009 ended in top 5 finalists.
 Samriddhi Rai, Miss Teen Nepal 2006 2nd runner up; later competed in Miss Nepal 2010 and ended as a top 5 finalists. In 2011, she got selected to join Miss Tourism Queen Int'l 2011.
 Prerana Shah, Miss Teen Nepal 2002 2nd runner up; joined Miss Nepal 2003 and become 1st runner up and ended as a top 10 semi finalists at Miss Asia Pacific 2003.
Jasmine Khadka, Miss Teen Nepal 2016 played role of "Sabyata" in Nepali popular serial "Parichaya". She is participating in Miss universe Nepal 2022.
Anushka Adhikari, Miss Teen Nepal 2016 2nd runner up played the role of "Biru" in youth popular Nepali series "21st love".
Miss Teen Nepal 2005, Priyanka Karki is national award winning actress of Nepali Movies Industry
Keshu Khadka, Miss Teen Nepal 2012 later participated  in Miss universe Nepal 2021, ended as 3rd runner up. Later, she competed in Mr&Miss Supranational Nepal 2022 where she finished as winner and represent Nepal in Miss Supranational 2022.

See also
Miss Nepal

External links
Miss Teen Nepal Official Website
Kathmandu Jaycees Website

References

Beauty pageants in Nepal
Nepalese awards
2002 establishments in Nepal